A gratuity (often called a tip) is a sum of money customarily given by a customer to certain service sector workers such as hospitality for the service they have performed, in addition to the basic price of the service. 

Tips and their amount are a matter of social custom and etiquette, and the custom varies between countries and between settings. In some countries, it is customary to tip servers in bars and restaurants, taxi drivers, hair stylists and so on. However, in some places tipping is not expected and may be discouraged or considered insulting. The customary amount of a tip can be a specific range or a certain percentage of the bill based on the perceived quality of the service given.

It is illegal to offer tips to some groups of workers, such as U.S. government workers and more widely police officers; the tips may be regarded as bribery. A fixed percentage service charge is sometimes added to bills in restaurants and similar establishments. Tipping may not be expected when a fee is explicitly charged for the service.

Giving a tip is typically irreversible, differentiating it from the reward mechanism of a placed order, which can be refunded. From a theoretical economic point of view, gratuities may solve the principal–agent problem (the situation in which an agent, such as a server, is working for a principal, such as a restaurant owner or manager) and many managers believe that tips provide incentive for greater worker effort. However, studies of the practice in America suggest that tipping is often discriminatory or arbitrary: workers receive different levels of gratuity based on factors such as age, sex, race, hair color and even breast size, and the size of the gratuity is found to be only tenuously related to the quality of service.

Etymology and history

According to the Oxford English Dictionary, the word "tip" originated as a slang term and its etymology is unclear. According to the Online Etymology Dictionary, the meaning "give a small present of money" began around 1600, and the meaning "give a gratuity to" is first attested in 1706. The noun in this sense is from 1755. The term in the sense of "to give a gratuity" first appeared in the 18th century. It derived from an earlier sense of tip, meaning "to give; to hand, pass", which originated in the thieves' cant in the 17th century. This sense may have derived from the 16th-century "tip" meaning "to strike or hit smartly but lightly" (which may have derived from the Low German tippen, "to tap"), but this derivation is "very uncertain". The word "tip" was first used as a verb in 1707 in George Farquhar's play The Beaux' Stratagem. Farquhar used the term after it had been "used in criminal circles as a word meant to imply the unnecessary and gratuitous gifting of something somewhat taboo, like a joke, or a sure bet, or illicit money exchanges." 

The etymology for the synonym for tipping, "gratuity", dates back either to the 1520s, from "graciousness", from the French gratuité (14th century) or directly from Medieval Latin gratuitas, "free gift", probably from earlier Latin gratuitus, "free, freely given". The meaning "money given for favor or services" is first attested in the 1530s. In some languages, the term translates to "drink money" or similar: for example pourboire in French, Trinkgeld in German, drikkepenge in Danish, drinksilver in Middle Scots, and napiwek in Polish. This comes from a custom of inviting a servant to drink a glass in honour of the guest, and paying for it, in order for the guests to show generosity among each other. The term bibalia in Latin was recorded in 1372.

The practice of tipping began in Tudor England. In medieval times, tipping was a master-serf custom wherein a servant would receive extra money for having performed superbly well. By the 17th century, it was expected that overnight guests to private homes would provide sums of money, known as vails, to the host's servants. Soon afterwards, customers began tipping in London coffeehouses and other commercial establishments". 

The practice was imported from Europe to America in the 1850s and 1860s by Americans who wanted to seem aristocratic.  However, until the early 20th century, Americans viewed tipping as inconsistent with the values of an egalitarian, democratic society, as the origins of tipping were premised upon noblesse oblige, which promoted tipping as a means to establish social status to inferiors.  Six American states passed laws that made tipping illegal. Enforcement of anti-tipping laws was problematic. The earliest of these laws was passed in 1909 (Washington), and the last of these laws was repealed in 1926 (Mississippi).  Some have argued that "The original workers that were not paid anything by their employers were newly freed slaves" and that "This whole concept of not paying them anything and letting them live on tips carried over from slavery." The anti-tipping movement spread to Europe with the support of the labour movement, which led to the eventual abolition of customary tipping in most European countries.

Also, proprietors regarded tips as equivalent to bribing an employee to do something that was otherwise forbidden, such as tipping a waiter to get an extra large portion of food. However, the introduction of Prohibition in the US in 1919 had an enormous impact on hotels and restaurants, who lost the revenue of selling alcoholic beverages. The resulting financial pressure caused proprietors to welcome tips, as a way of supplementing employee wages. Contrary to popular belief, tipping did not arise because of servers' low wages, because the occupation of waiter (server) was fairly well paid in the era when tipping became institutionalized.

Reasons for tipping
Tipping researcher Michael Lynn identifies five motivations for tipping:
 Showing off
 To supplement the server's income and make them happy
 For improved future service
 To avoid disapproval from the server
 A sense of duty

A 2009 academic paper by Steven Holland calls tipping "an effective mechanism for risk sharing and welfare improvement" which reduces the risk faced by a service customer, because the customer can decide whether or not to tip. Tipping is sometimes given as an example of the principal–agent problem in economics. One example is a restaurant owner who engages servers to act as agents on his behalf. In some cases, "[c]ompensation agreements [can] increase worker effort [...] if compensation is [...] tied to the firm's success" and one example of such a compensation agreement is waiters and waitresses who are paid tips. Studies show however that, in the real world, the size of the tip is only weakly correlated with the quality of the service and other effects dominate.

Tronc
A tronc is an arrangement for the pooling and distribution to employees of tips, gratuities and/or service charges in the hotel and catering trade. The person who distributes monies from the tronc is known as the troncmaster. Where a tronc exists in the UK, responsibility for deducting pay-as-you-earn taxes from the distribution may lie with the troncmaster rather than the employer. The word "tronc" has its origins in the French for collecting box. In June 2008, the Employment Appeals Tribunal ruled in a UK test case (Revenue and Customs Commissioners v Annabel’s (Berkeley Square) Ltd) that income from a tronc cannot be counted when assessing whether a wage or salary meets the national minimum wage.

Mandatory tipping

Tipping may not be expected when a fee is explicitly charged for the service. A service charge is sometimes added to bills in restaurants and similar establishments. Attempts to hide service charge by obscuring the line on the receipt have been reported. A service charge, or fee assessed, is determined by and paid directly to the company. The charges may be for services rendered, administrative fees, or processing cost.

In the United States, criminal charges were dropped in two separate cases over non-payment of mandatory gratuities. Courts ruled that automatic does not mean mandatory. Some cruise lines charge their patrons US$10 per day in mandatory tipping; this does not include extra gratuities for alcoholic beverages.

By region

Africa

Nigeria
In Nigeria tipping is common at upscale hotels and restaurants but a service charge is usually included in the bill, though the employees rarely get this as part of their wages.

Madagascar
In Madagascar, tipping is not expected.

Morocco

In Morocco tipping (تْدْوِيرَة | Romanized : Tedwira) isn't mandatory, but rounding up the bill and leaving tips at restaurants and cafes, or to the service providers is a standard practice and appreciated.

Asia

China
In China, traditionally there is no tipping. However, hotels that routinely serve foreign tourists allow tipping, as do tour guides and associated drivers.

In cities bordering Hong Kong like Shenzhen, some restaurants and hotels also started to charge gratuity since the 1980s.

Hong Kong, China 
In Hong Kong, tipping is not typically expected at hotels or restaurant establishments, where a "service charge" of 10% is added to a bill instead of expecting a gratuity. Taxi drivers in Hong Kong may also charge the difference between a fare and a round sum as a "courtesy fee" to avoid making change for larger bills.

Japan
As a service charge is typically included as part of bills at hotels and restaurants, tipping is generally not practiced in Japan. In addition, Japan has a set of traditions and customs regarding giving money as a gift, so tipping may cause confusion or be considered rude if the money is given without being placed in a special gift envelope first. Like many other countries in East Asia, Japanese people see tipping as insulting.

India
In India tipping is not normal in hotels and restaurants, but may be appreciated. If eating a casual meal—breakfast or snack—with a bill total less than ₹1000, then a 10% tip is expected and appreciated. If small bills are handy, tips can be in multiples of ₹10 notes.

Malaysia
In Malaysia, tipping is not the norm and is not expected for any service. Instead restaurants can add a service charge of 10% to the bill. In Malaysia the people are familiar with tipping, so if a person does leave a tip then it is accepted and appreciated. Tips, when given, usually take the form of rounding up the bill.

Pakistan

Tipping is not an obligation, and it is not considered rude not to tip, though workers will be pleased if tipped. Normally in low to medium-end restaurants, the bill is rounded up to the nearest Rs.100 or 1000 and the change is given as tip either directly to the waiter or left on the table.

In more formal settings, hotels and restaurants add a 10% service charge to the bill, which is paid along with the bill itself.

Philippines

Tipping is not customary in most areas and is not generally expected.

In upscale restaurants, if a service charge is added, tipping is not needed nor expected.  Among smaller side street restaurants, service charge is usually not included and tip amount may vary from loose changes to not at all (most do not give tips). The customer in this case can give any amount he/she wishes.

Fastfood areas (McDonald's, Jollibee, Popeyes, etc.) are not tipping locations and staffs are reluctant to accept money.

Hotels bellboys are generally provided tips but amount is not fixed and may depend on the customer. Taxis are not provided tips but customer may pay extra to avoid loose change (usual range of 10 to 30 pesos). App based vehicles (Grab etc.) are usually paid tips via app and therefore under the discretion of the customer.

There are establishments that strictly implement a "No tipping policy".

There are establishments that can accept tips but must be placed in designated tipping containers.

Korea
Tipping is not customary in Korean culture, and tipping is not expected in the general service industry. Some people even regard tipping as an inappropriate behavior. High-end hotels and restaurants often include a service charge of between 10% to 15%, but it is always included in the bill and customers are not expected to leave an additional gratuity for servers.

Singapore
In Singapore, bars and restaurants typically add a 10% service charge, which is subject to the 8% Goods & Services Tax. Excess tipping is not practiced and is rarely expected in most instances. Tips may be regarded as an insult or mistaken for illegal bribery. Taxi drivers given a tip will mistake it for overpayment, and return the exact change.

Taiwan
In Taiwan, tipping is not customary, but all mid and high end restaurants include a mandatory "10% service charge", which is not given to the service staff, but rather considered by Taiwanese law as general revenue, as reported by the Taipei Times in "False Gratuity" on July 9, 2013.

Nepal

In Nepal, tipping is not compulsory but people working on tourism sectors and hotel area always look for a tip. Mostly the guide and porters who walk many days with clients to make their adventure successful. All the  trekking company in Nepal also advice clients to tip guide and porters. Some company advice to tip high some advice to tip low cost.

Europe

Albania

Tipping (bakshish) in Albania is very much expected almost everywhere. In recent times it has become more common, as many foreigners and Albanians living abroad visit Albania. Leaving a tip of around 10% of the bill is customary in restaurants; even porters, guides and chauffeurs expect tips. Duty-free alcohol is often used as a type of tip for porters, bellhops and the like, though some people (such as Muslims) can find it offensive.

Austria
Tipping is not required but often expected, particularly in restaurants where roughly 5% to 10% is common. This depends on the service one received and the restaurant level (low, medium, high prices). In standard restaurants it is OK to round up to the next euro. Another common setting where tipping is customary is taxis, where bills may be rounded up to the next euro.

Croatia
Even though most people in the service industry are paid a living wage, tips (in Croatian: napojnica, manča) are quite common. 10% (or more, depending on the service) is expected in restaurants. Absence of a tip is generally interpreted as dissatisfaction with the food and/or service. In clubs and café bars, it is common to round up the bill (e.g. to 10 kn if the bill is more than 5 kn, or 100 kn if the bill is 88 kn). Tips are always expected in cash, even when the bill is paid by credit card. If a customer leaves a tip with a credit card, the employee does not receive any of it. It is not common to tip hairdressers, but the rounding-up method is common for taxi drivers.

Czech Republic 
Tipping (spropitné, informally dýško or tuzér) in the Czech Republic, like in Germany and Austria, is optional but polite and very welcome, especially in restaurants, and less often in taxis, hairdressers and similar services. The usual practice is for the customer to round the price to the nearest higher "nice number" so as not to have to handle small coins, and to tell the waiter what amount to round the price to. The resulting tip tends to be around 10%, but this is not a hard and fast rule. So, for example, if the waiter says the price is 279 CZK, the customer pays with a 500 CZK note and says: "Three hundred crowns." This means that the waiter should return only 200 CZK and keep 21 CZK as a tip. When paying by card, the tip can either be added to the payment or given separately in cash.  If the waiter does not have to return anything after rounding up (e.g. if the price is 174 CZK and the customer pays with a 200 CZK note), it is customary to say "To je v pořádku" ("Keep the change", literally "That's alright"). A tip of more than 10-15% is more likely to be given in recognition of outstanding service. On the other hand, especially in the case of dissatisfaction with the service, it is perfectly acceptable not to tip at all. It is not customary to leave a tip on the table. According to Czech law, service charge must always be included in the listed price (but tips do not appear in the bill). Some Prague restaurants have been reported to display "Service is not included" signs to persuade foreign tourists to pay more, mimicking the practice in the United States. However, this is a scam.

Denmark
Tips (drikkepenge, lit. "drinking money") are not required in Denmark since service charges must always be included in the bill by law. Tipping for outstanding service is a matter of choice, but is not expected.

Estonia
In Estonia, tipping (jootraha) is not required and never expected.

Finland
In Finland, tipping is never expected. Rounding the bill in restaurant, hairsalon or in taxi is not frowned upon. If service is great one can give a tip, usually around 10%.

France
Tips (pourboires, lit. "for drinking") in France are neither required nor expected, and should only be offered after the customer received outstanding service. Waiters are paid a living wage and do not depend on tips, and cafés and restaurants are required by law to include a service charge (usually 15%) in the menu price; it is not usually set out separately on the bill. Tipping is better received in venues accustomed to tourists, but can be treated with disdain in smaller food establishments and those in more rural areas. Should one decide to tip after experiencing excellent service, it is customary to round up to the next Euro for small bills, and up to 5% for larger ones. Anything over 5% is considered very generous. For superior service in higher-end eating establishments, a more generous (10% or more) tip would not be out of place. Tips should always be offered in cash, as credit card terminals don't include a tipping option. Attending a performance in a private theater may be the only case in France where a tip is expected (generally €1), even though it is illegal.

Germany 

Tipping (Trinkgeld) is not seen as obligatory. In the case of waiting staff, and in the context of a debate about a minimum wage, some people disapprove of tipping and say that it should not substitute for employers paying a good basic wage. But most people in Germany consider tipping to be good manners as well as a way to express gratitude for good service.

It is illegal, and rare, to charge a service fee without the customer's consent. But a tip of about 5% to 10%, depending on the type of service, is customary. For example, Germans usually tip their waiters. As a rule of thumb, the more personal the service, the more common it is to tip. Payments by card can include the tip too, but the tip is usually paid in cash when the card is handed over.

At times, rather than tipping individually, a tipping box is set up. Rounding up the bill in Germany is commonplace, sometimes with the comment stimmt so ("keep the change"), rather than asking for all the change and leaving the tip afterwards. Or the customer says how much he will pay in total, including the tip: thus if the basic price is €10.50, the customer might, rather generously but not unusually, say zwölf ("twelve"), pay with a €20 note and get €8 in change. When paying a small amount, it is common to round up to the nearest euro (e.g. €1.80 to €2.00).

Sometimes a sign reading Aufrunden bitte ("round up please") is found in places where tipping is not common (like supermarkets, or clothing retailers). This requests that the bill be rounded up to the nearest €0.10. This is not to tip the staff, but a charity donation (fighting child poverty), and completely voluntary.

In Germany tips are considered as income, but they are tax free according to § 3 Nr. 51 of the German Income Tax Law.

Hungary
Tipping is widespread in Hungary; the degree of expectation and the expected amount varies with price, type and quality of service, and also influenced by the satisfaction of the customer. As in Germany, rounding up the price to provide a tip is commonplace. The typical value of a tip is 10 percent in Hungary.

Depending on the situation, tipping might be unusual, optional or expected. Almost all bills include a service charge; similarly, some employers calculate wages on the basis that the employee would also receive tips, while others prohibit accepting them. In some cases a tip is only given if the customer is satisfied; in others it is customary to give a certain percentage regardless of the quality of the service; and there are situations when it is hard to tell the difference from a bribe. Widespread tipping based on loosely defined customs and an almost imperceptible transition into bribery is considered a main factor contributing to corruption. (Hungary's healthcare system is almost completely state-run and there is an obligatory social insurance system.)

Iceland
In Iceland, tipping (þjórfé, lit. "serving money") is not customary and never expected. Foreign tourists sometimes still tip without thinking because that is the custom in their home country. Tourist guides in Iceland also sometimes encourage their guests to tip them, but there is no requirement to do so.

Ireland
It is uncommon for Irish people to tip cleaning staff at hotel. Tips are sometimes given to reward high quality service or as a kind gesture, particularly during the Christmas holiday season. Tipping is most often done by leaving small change (5–10%) at the table or rounding up the bill, or for a taxi driver.

However, some people may choose to tip in restaurants and for food deliveries. Hairdressers are expected to be tipped for a good job, usually 5–20 euro.

Tips and service charges, whether mandatory or not, collected electronically such as by credit card payment must be distributed in full to staff. Tips distributed this way are to be treated as pay and tax deducted in the usual way, while cash tips must be declared by staff via a tax return.

Italy
Tips (la mancia) are not customary in Italy, and are given only for a special service or as thanks for high quality service, but they are very uncommon. Almost all restaurants (with the notable exception of those in Rome) have a service charge (called coperto and/or servizio). As restaurants are required to inform customers of any fees they charge, they usually list the coperto/servizio on the menu.

Netherlands
Tipping (fooi) in the Netherlands is not obligatory by law as all the service cost are included in the listed price for the products and the income of the staff is not depending on the provided (amount or quality of) service. However everybody is free to donate. It is illegal to charge (an extra) service fee without the customer's consent.

Norway
It is uncommon for Norwegians to tip taxi drivers or cleaning staff at hotels. In restaurants and bars it is more common, but not expected. Tips are often given to reward high quality service or as a kind gesture. Tipping is most often done by leaving small change (5–15%) at the table or rounding up the bill.

Oslo Servitørforbund and Hotell- og Restaurantarbeiderforbundet (The Labor Union for Hotel and Restaurant Employees) has said many times that they discourage tipping, except for extraordinary service, because it makes salaries decrease over time, makes it harder to negotiate salaries and does not count towards pensions, unemployment insurance, loans and other benefits.

Romania
The amount of the tip (bacşiş) and method of calculating it will vary with the venue and can vary from 1–2 RON to 10% of the bill. The tips do not appear on bills and are not taxed. If paying by card, the tip is left in cash alongside the bill. While tipping is not the norm, servers, taxi drivers, hairdressers, hotel maids, parking valets, tour guides, spa therapists et al. are used to receiving tips regularly, and are likely to consider it an expression of appreciation for the quality of the service (or lack of it). If offering a tip, 5–10% of the bill is customary, or small amounts of 5, 10 or 20 RON for services which are not directly billed. For other types of services it depends on circumstances; it will not usually be refused, but will be considered a sign of appreciation. For instance, counter clerks in drugstores or supermarkets are not tipped, but their counterparts in clothing stores can be.

Tipping can be used proactively to obtain favors, such as reservations or better seats. However, care should be taken for it not to be seen as a bribe, depending on circumstances. While tipping is overlooked in Romania, bribery is a larger issue which may have legal consequences. There is an ongoing aversion about both giving and receiving tips in coins, due to the low value of the denominations. It is best to stick to paper money. Offering coins can be considered a rude gesture and may prompt sarcastic or even angry remarks.

On the other hand, the coin handling aversion has resulted in the widespread practice of rounding payments. This is not technically a tip, and as such is not aimed primarily at the individual at the counter, but rather at the business. Nevertheless, if done with a smile it can be seen as a form of appreciation from the customer towards the clerk. Etiquette demands that one of the parties offers the change, but the other can choose to tell them to keep all or part of it. Small businesses may sometimes force the issue by just claiming they are out of change, or offering small value products instead, such as sticks of gum; this is considered rude and it is up to the customer to accept or call them out for it. The reverse can also happen, where the clerk does not have small change to make for the customer's paper money, but chooses to return a smaller paper denomination and round down in favor of the customer, in exchange for getting them through faster. The latter usually happens only in the larger store chains.

Russia
In Russian language, a gratuity is called chayeviye (чаевые), which literally means "for the tea". Tipping small amounts of money in Russia for people such as waiters, cab drivers and hotel bellboys was quite common before the Communist Revolution of 1917. During the Soviet era, and especially with the Stalinist reforms of the 1930s, tipping was discouraged and was considered an offensive capitalist tradition aimed at belittling and lowering the status of the working class. So from then until the early 1990s tipping was seen as rude and offensive. With the fall of the Soviet Union and the dismantling of the Iron Curtain in 1991, and the subsequent influx of foreign tourists and businessmen into the country, tipping started a slow but steady comeback. Since the early 2000s tipping has become somewhat of a norm again. However, still a lot of confusion persists around tipping: Russians do not have a widespread consensus on how much to tip, for what services, where and how. In larger urban areas, like Moscow and St Petersburg, tips of 10% are expected in high-end restaurants, coffee shops, bars and hotels, and are normally left in cash on the table, after the bill is paid by credit card; or as part of cash payment if a credit card is not used. Tipping at a buffet or any other budget restaurant, where there are no servers to take one's order at the table (called stolovaya) is not expected and not appropriate. Fast food chains, such as Vkusno & Tochka, Chaynaya Lozhka, Teremok and so on, do not allow tipping either. Tipping bartenders in a pub is not common, but it is expected in an up-market bar. Metered taxi drivers also count on a tip of 5–10%, but non-metered drivers who pre-negotiate the fare do not expect one. It should also be noted that the older Russians, who grew up and lived most of their lives during the Soviet era, still consider tipping an offensive practice and detest it. In smaller rural towns, tipping is rarely expected and may even cause confusion.

Slovenia
Tipping is common in Slovenia, but most locals do not tip other than to round up to the nearest euro. Absence of a tip is generally interpreted as dissatisfaction with the food and/or service. Since about 2007, areas visited by many tourists have begun to accept tips of around 10–20%.

Spain
Tipping (propina) is not generally considered mandatory in Spain, and depends on the quality of the service received. In restaurants the amount of the tip, if any, depends mainly on the kind of locale: higher percentages are expected in upscale restaurants. In bars and small restaurants, Spaniards sometimes leave as a tip the small change left on their plate after paying a bill. Outside the restaurant business, some service providers, such as taxi drivers, hairdressers and hotel personnel, may expect a tip in an upscale setting. In 2007 the Minister of Economy, Pedro Solbes, blamed excessive tipping for the increase in the inflation rate.

Sweden
Tipping (dricks) is commonly not expected, but is practiced to reward high quality service or as a kind gesture. Tipping is most often done by leaving small change on the table or rounding up the bill. This is mostly done at restaurants (less often if payment is made at the desk) and in taxis (some taxis are very expensive as there is no fixed tariff, so they might not be tipped). Less often hairdressers are tipped. Tips are taxed in Sweden, but cash tips are not often declared to the tax authority. Cards are heavily used in Sweden as of the 2010s, and tips paid by cards in restaurants are regularly checked by the tax authority.

Turkey
In Turkey, tipping, or bahşiş (lit. gift, from the Persian word بخشش, often rendered in English as "baksheesh") is usually optional and not customary in many places. Though not necessary, a tip of 5–10% is appreciated in restaurants, and is usually paid by "leaving the change". Cab drivers usually do not expect to be tipped, though passengers may round up the fare. A tip of small change may be given to a hotel porter.

United Kingdom

Tipping is not expected in Britain the way it is in some other countries; however, for the majority of people tipping in some circumstances is customary as a sign of appreciation. Workers do not officially have to rely on their tips to live, and all staff in the UK must be paid at least the National Minimum Wage. This varies by age: it is £8.91 for those aged 23 and over, £8.36 for those aged 21 to 22, £6.56 for those aged 18 to 20 and £4.62 for those under 18.

Employers are also banned from topping up wages with tips from customers. However rounding up a bill is acceptable (but not required) at restaurants with table service, and also for barbers, hairdressers and taxi drivers.

Sometimes, more often in London than in other areas, or at expensive restaurants, a service charge may be included in the bill, or added separately. 12.5% is reported as a common amount. Since it is a legal requirement to include all taxes and other obligatory charges in the prices displayed, a service charge is compulsory only if it is displayed, or the trader makes it clear verbally, before the meal. Even so, if the level of service is unacceptable, and in particular it falls short of the requirements of the Supply of Goods and Services Act 1982, the customer can refuse to pay some or all of a service charge.

North America and the Caribbean

Canada

Tipping is practiced in Canada in a similar, but often less vigorous manner than the United States. Though a 10-15% gratuity is fairly common when food is served, tipping is not otherwise as widespread as in American culture. This has led to concerns in American border cities, where businesses relying on Canadian tourists often suffer. 

In Canadian provinces other than Quebec, a deeply entrenched practice is "tipping out", in which servers' tips are shared with kitchen staff, a practice that would be illegal in the United States. Another custom in some restaurants is "house tipping", in which the manager or owner takes a share of the tips, a practice that is permitted in some provinces and forbidden in others.

Canadian Federal tax law considers tips as income. Workers who receive tips are legally required to report the income to the Canada Revenue Agency and pay income tax on it. In July 2012, The Toronto Star reported that CRA is concerned with tax evasion. An auditing of 145 servers in four restaurants by CRA mentioned in the report uncovered that among 145 staff audited, C$1.7 million was unreported. In 2005, The CRA was quoted that it will closely check the tax returns of individuals who would reasonably be expected to be receiving tips to ensure that the tips are reported realistically.

Caribbean
Tipping in the Caribbean varies from island to island. In the Dominican Republic, restaurants add a 10% gratuity and it is customary to tip an extra 10%. In St. Barths, it is expected that a tip be 10% to 15% if gratuity is not already included.

Mexico

Workers in small, economy restaurants usually do not expect a tip. However, tipping in Mexico is common in larger, medium and higher end restaurants. It is customary in these establishments to tip not less than 10% but not more than 15% of the bill as a voluntary offering for good service based on the total bill before value added tax, "IVA" in English, VAT. Value added tax is already included in menu or other service industry pricing since Mexican Consumer Law requires the exhibition of final costs for the customer. Thus, the standard tip in Mexico is 11.5% of the pre-tax bill which equates to 10% after tax in most of the Mexican territory, except in special lower tax stimulus economic zones.

Tips to taxi drivers are unusual in Mexico, but drivers used to ask for them from tourists, knowing that is common in other countries. Locally, taxi drivers are only tipped when they offer an extra service, like helping with the luggage or similar help.

A gratuity may be added to the bill without the customer's consent, contrary to the law, either explicitly printed on the bill, or by more surreptitious means alleging local custom, in some restaurants, bars, and night clubs. However, in 2012, officials began a campaign to eradicate this increasingly rampant and abusive practice not only due to it violating Mexican consumer law, but also because frequently it was retained by owners or management.

If a service charge for tip ("propina" or "restaurant service charge") is added, it is a violation of Article 10 of the Mexican Federal Law of the Consumer and Mexican authorities recommend patrons require management to refund or deduct this from their bill. Additionally, in this 2012 Federal initiative to eliminate the illegal add-ons, the government clarified that contrary even to the belief of many Mexicans, that the Mexican legal definition of tips ("propinas") require it be discretionary to pay so that an unsatisfied client is under no obligation to pay anything to insure the legal definition of a tip is consistent with the traditional, cultural definition, and going as far to encourage all victims subject to the increasing illicit practice report the establishments to the PROFECO, the Office of the Federal Prosecutor for the Consumer, for prosecution.

United States

Tipping is a practiced social custom in the United States. Tipping by definition is voluntary – at the discretion of the customer. In restaurants offering traditional table service, a gratuity of 15–20% of the amount of a customer’s check (before tax) is customary when good to excellent service is provided. In buffet-style restaurants where the server brings only beverages, 10–15% is customary. Higher tips may be given for excellent service, and lower tips for mediocre service. In the case of bad or rude service no tip may be given, and the restaurant manager may be notified of the problem.  Tips are also generally given for services provided at golf courses, casinos, hotels, spas, salons, and for concierge services, food delivery, and taxis. This etiquette applies to service at weddings where the host should provide appropriate tips to workers at the end of an event; the amount may be negotiated in the contract.

The Fair Labor Standards Act defines tippable employees as individuals who customarily and regularly receive tips of $30 or more per month. Federal law permits employers to include tips towards satisfying the difference between employees' hourly wage and minimum wage. Federal minimum wage for tipped employees in the United States is $2.13 per hour, as long as the combination of tips and $2.13 hourly wage exceed the standard minimum wage of $7.25 per hour, although some states and territories provide more generous provisions for tipped employees. For example, laws in Alaska, California, Minnesota, Montana, Nevada, Oregon, Washington, and Guam specify that employees must be paid the full minimum wage of that state/territory (which is equal or higher than the federal minimum wage in these instances) before tips are considered.

However, a report in 2012 from the Department of Labor's and Wage and Hours Division (WHD) uncovered that 84% of the 9,000 restaurants they investigated disobeyed the subminimum wage system. In the end the WHD found "1,170 tip credit infractions that resulted in nearly $5.5 million in back wages."

Before 2018, a tip pool could not be allocated to employers, or to employees who do not customarily and regularly receive tips. These non-eligible employees included dishwashers, cooks, chefs, and janitors. In March 2018 an amendment was added to the Fair Labor Standards Act (FLSA) that allowed restaurants in a majority of states to split the split tips between front and back of house workers. Before this legislation passed there was concern of income inequality and the ability to pay rents between front and back of house workers. Over the span of 30 years since 1985 back of house workers in New York City restaurants had a compensation increase of about 25%. Meanwhile, their front of house counterpoints saw an increase of 300% in compensation. In 2015 the average wage of cooking staff in New York was $10–12, many of whom dealt with high monthly rent payments and also debt from culinary school. As seemingly low skilled front of house workers were making more money than the skilled back of house chefs, many cooks decided to switch over into serving instead.

There is only limited information available on levels of tipping. A study at Iowa State University provided data for a suburban restaurant surveyed in the early 1990s. The mean tip was $3.00 on a mean bill of $19.78. As such, the mean tip rate was 16.1%, and the median tip rate was about 15%. In a 2003 research study at Brigham Young University, the sample restaurants had an average tip percentage ranging from 13.57 to 14.69% between 1999 and 2002. A 2001 study done at Cornell University exploring the relationship between tip amount and quality of service has shown that quality of service is only weakly related to the amount the server is tipped by the guest. This study suggests that servers who provide amazing service are tipped marginally better, if not better at all, than servers who provide standard service.

According to the National Restaurant Association, only a handful of restaurants in the United States have adopted a no-tipping model and some restaurants who have adopted this model returned to tipping due to loss of employees to competitors.

Service charges 
Service charges are mandatory payments, typically added by caterers and banqueters. A service charge is not to be confused with a tip or gratuity which is optional and at the discretion of the customer. Restaurants commonly add it to checks for large parties. Some bars have decided to include service charge as well, for example in Manhattan, New York. Disclosure of service charge is required by law in some places, such as in State of Florida A standard predetermined percent, often ~18%, is sometimes labeled as a "service charge".

Taxation

Tips are considered income. The entire tip amount is treated as earned wages with the exception of months in which tip income was under $20. Unlike wages where payroll tax (Social Security and Medicare tax) are split between employee and employer, the employee pays 100% of payroll tax on tip income and tips are excluded from worker's compensation premiums in most states. This discourages no-tip policies because employers would pay 7.65% additional payroll taxes and up to 9% worker's compensation premiums on higher wages in lieu of tips.

Research finds that consistent tax evasion by waitstaff due to fraudulent declaration is a concern in the US. According to the IRS, between 40% and 50% of tips to waiters are not reported for taxation. Employers are responsible for Federal Unemployment Insurance premiums on tips paid directly from customers to employees, and this encourages employers to collaborate in under reporting tips.

Employee taxation responsibilities
The IRS states that employees making income from tips have three main responsibilities.

 Keep a daily tip record.
 Report tips to the employer, unless less than $20.
 Report all tips on an individual income tax return.

Tips should be reported to employers by the 10th of the month after the tips were received unless the 10th ends up landing on a weekend day or a legal holiday. In that case the tips should be reported on the next available day that is not a weekend or a legal holiday. If the employee does not report the tips earned to their employer the employer will not be liable for the employer share of social security and Medicare taxes on the unreported tips. Employers will also not be liable for withholding and paying the employee's share of social security and Medicare taxes.

Employer taxation responsibilities
Employers that hire employees that make tips for their income have 5 main responsibilities with the IRS.

 Retain employee tip reports.
 Withhold employee income taxes.
 Withhold employee share of social security and Medicare taxes.
 Report this information to the IRS.
 Pay the employer share of social security and Medicare taxes based on the reported tip income.
Employers should distinguish between service charges and tipped income and file and report the two separately. An employer operating a large food or beverage establishment will need to file a specific Form 8027 for each establishment they operate. A business that is recognized as a large food or beverage establishment must fall into all four categories shown below:

 The food or beverage operation must be based in one of the 50 states in the United States or the District of Columbia.
 Food and beverage is served for consumption on the premises. This does not include fast food operations.
 Customers tipping employees at the food or beverage operation must be a common practice.
 In the last year the operation employed over 10 employees on a typical business day regularly.

US federal employees
The US Government recognizes tips as allowable expenses for federal employee travel.  However, US law prohibits federal employees from receiving tips under Standards of Ethical Conduct.  Asking for, accepting or agreeing to take anything of value that influences the performance of an official act is not allowed.   A 2011 rule issued by the US Department of Labor which prohibited employers from tip pooling employees who were paid at least the federal minimum wage and who don't "customarily and regularly" receive tips was repealed in 2018.  Instead, workers will have more rights to sue their employers for stolen tips, with assistance from the US Department of Labor.

Ride sharing
In the past ride sharing companies in the US were against the implementation of a tipping system.  Uber wanted to prioritize quick transactions through their app and believed a tipping system would lead to an inconvenient experience for users.  In 2017 Uber started its "180 days of change" to improve relations with its drivers.  Part of the PR campaign included adding a tipping option to the app.  The data shows that given the option to tip, close to 60% of Uber users never tip their drivers and only 1% will consistently tip their drivers.  Only 16% of rides will result in the driver being tipped and the average tip amount in 2019 was $3.11.

Discrimination 
A study from 2005 showed that average tips varied depending on the race of New Haven cab drivers.  The average tip for white cab drivers was 20.3%, while black cab drivers received 12.6%, and cab drivers of other races received 12.4%.  Both the study with cab drivers and another study about a southern restaurant showed that both white and black customers tipped black workers less on average than their white counterparts.

Possible elimination of subminimum wage
In 2019, the US House of Representatives passed a bill that would increase the minimum wage to $15 by 2025. If the bill was passed it would also eliminate the subminimum wage system.  This would mean employers would have to pay their tipped workers $15 instead of the $2.13 right now. Many workers argue this would bring financial stability for many the 13% of tipped workers that live in poverty. Others workers who make a large amount of their money from tips believe the removal of a subminimum wage would lower their income from tips. The US Senate is expected to vote on the bill after the 2020 election.

South America

Bolivia
Service charges are included with the bill. A tip of around 5% or so is sometimes given, and is considered polite.

Brazil
Most restaurants include a non-obligatory service charge on the bill, which under standard practice is 10% (so much so that "10%" is used in Brazilian Portuguese as a synonym for "tip"). There is no legal obligation to pay, however it is really expected by the staff, and declining to pay it can cause distress and confusion, since it is considered part of the salary. Currently, due to tax law changes, restaurants some times charge 12%, while expensive restaurants can charge up to 15% (or more). However, paying less than 10% would be seen as a complaint.

"Caixinha" (literally "little box") is a gratuity left at juice shops or other places that sell food or beer but are not full restaurants. This is not expected and can be just the coins from the change. Usually the change is dropped in a box besides the cashier. This box is festively decorated during the Christmas period.

Taxi drivers do not receive tips. Delivery was tipped, but now is usually charged and most people no longer tip. A lot of small services can be tipped with anything from 1 to 5 reals, or even more in a luxury establishment, like parking drivers, luggage carriers, gas station attendants that did any job beyond filling one's tank, etc. Usually, if one pay for these services, they do not tip.

Paraguay
Service charges are included with the bill and tipping is uncommon.

Oceania

Australia

Tipping is not expected or required in Australia. The minimum wage in Australia is reviewed yearly, and as of 2017 it was set at A$17.70 per hour (A$22.125 for casual employees) and this is fairly standard across all types of venues. Tipping at cafés and restaurants (especially for a large party), and tipping of taxi drivers and home food deliverers is again, not required or expected. However many people tend to round up the amount owed while indicating that they are happy to let the worker "keep the change".

There is no tradition of tipping somebody who is just providing a service (e.g. a hotel porter). Casinos in Australia—and some other places—generally prohibit tipping of gaming staff, as it is considered bribery. For example, in the state of Tasmania, the Gaming Control Act 1993 states in section 56 (4): "It is a condition of every special employee's licence that the special employee must not solicit or accept any gratuity, consideration or other benefit from a patron in a gaming area". There is concern that tipping might become more common in Australia.

New Zealand
Tipping is not a traditional practice in New Zealand, though has become more common in recent years, especially in finer establishments. Tipping in New Zealand is likely the result of tourists visiting from tipping cultures (such as the United States) who may follow their own tipping customs. It is still extremely rare among locals, especially among the working and middle-class. The minimum wage in New Zealand is reviewed yearly, and as of April 2022 was set at NZ$21.20 per hour for employees 18 and over.

Where tipping does occur among New Zealanders it is usually to reward a level of service that is far in excess of the customer's expectations, or as an unsolicited reward for a voluntary act of service. A number of websites published by the New Zealand government advise tourists that "tipping in New Zealand is not obligatory – even in restaurants and bars. However, tipping for good service or kindness is at the discretion of the visitor". A Sunday Star-Times reader poll in 2011 indicated 90% of their readers did not want tipping for good service to become the norm in New Zealand.

Criticisms

Inconsistency of percentage-based gratuities

In countries where tipping is the norm, some employers pay workers with the expectation that their wages will be supplemented by tips. Some have criticized the inherent "social awkwardness" in transactions that involve tipping, the inconsistency of tipping for some services but not similar ones, and the irrationality of basing tips on price, rather than the amount and quality of service (a customer pays a larger tip to a server bringing a lobster rather than a hamburger, for example). Also in countries where tips are not paid by most but where many do, managers tell new waiters that the salary might not be so high but there will be tips, meaning that waiters get little reward for serving customers who do not pay a tip.

Travellers following home rather than local customs
Some nationalities, such as people from the United States, are used to paying tips, and often do so even when they visit countries where this is less of a norm. In contrast, tourists from such countries may neglect to pay tips when they visit countries such as the US where tips are expected. This is particularly common in American cities along the Canadian border, and is seen as a problem by many in the hospitality sector.

Discomfort
Tipping might be discomforting to some people because it adds the necessity of figuring out the tip amount each time, which is made harder by the fact that the tip amount the service provider is hoping to receive, is in general unknown to the customer. As lack of, or too low, tip might offend the service provider this adds the discomfort of fear of creating an unpleasant social encounter to each service purchase transaction the customer suspects might involve the expectation of tipping.
Tipping might be discomforting also to some service providers as they might view it as derogating to their occupation, as "a token of inferiority". William Scott in his The Itching Palm study wrote: "The relation of a man giving a tip and a man accepting it is as undemocratic as the relation of master and slave. A citizen in a republic ought to stand shoulder to shoulder with every other citizen, with no thought of cringing, without an assumption of superiority or an acknowledgment of inferiority".

Discrimination
In the episode of the Freakonomics podcast Lynn found that "attractive waitresses get better tips than less attractive waitresses. Men’s appearance, not so important". Lynn's research also found that "blondes get better tips than brunettes. Slender women get better tips than heavier women. Large breasted women get better tips than smaller breasted women.” A woman server interviewed for the podcast episode stated: "lost my job because my manager said that I didn’t fit the look of the company, or the restaurant. So I don’t know if it was because I’m a lot more curvier than the other girls or because my skin is darker. I don’t know".

Lynn states of tipping: "It’s discriminatory. Yes, and the Supreme Court has ruled that even neutral business practices that are not intended to discriminate, if they have the effect of adversely impacting a protected class are illegal. And so it’s not inconceivable to me that there will be a class-action lawsuit on the part of ethnic minority waiters and waitresses claiming discrimination in terms of employment. And it’s conceivable that tipping might be declared illegal on that basis.”

Bribery and corruption
Bribery and corruption are sometimes disguised as tipping. In some developing countries, police officers, border guards, and other civil servants openly solicit tips, gifts and dubious fees using a variety of local euphemisms.

References

Further reading

External links

 Collection of research papers on tipping by Michael Lynn
 The Trouble with Tipping
 Tipping in Spain 
 "Why Tip?"—New York Times article about San Diego restaurant which stopped accepting tips

Customer service
Food and drink terminology
Hotel terminology
Household income
Services sector of the economy